Herman B. VanPeyma House is a historic home located at Lancaster in Erie County, New York.  It a locally significant distinct example of the eclectic architecture featuring the Queen Anne style, built circa 1890.  It was built for Herman Boetkhout VanPeyma, an early Dutch immigrant to the Town of Lancaster.

It was listed on the National Register of Historic Places in 1999. It is located in the Broadway Historic District.

References

External links
VanPeyma, Herman B., House - U.S. National Register of Historic Places on Waymarking.com

Houses on the National Register of Historic Places in New York (state)
Queen Anne architecture in New York (state)
Houses in Erie County, New York
National Register of Historic Places in Erie County, New York
Historic district contributing properties in Erie County, New York